Léandre Bizagwira (born 9 June 1981) is a Rwandan footballer. He played in 14 matches for the Rwanda national football team from 2000 to 2004. He was also named in Rwanda's squad for the 2004 African Cup of Nations tournament.

References

1981 births
Living people
Rwandan footballers
Rwanda international footballers
2004 African Cup of Nations players
Place of birth missing (living people)
Association football defenders
Etincelles F.C. players
S.C. Kiyovu Sports players